

Overview

Republican 
 
 

Democratic

District 1

Incumbent Democratic Congressman William Lacy Clay Jr. faced no difficulty in seeking another term in this liberal, St. Louis-based district over Republican Mark Byrne and Libertarian Robb Cunningham.

District 2

Though confronted with a powerful Democratic wave, incumbent Republican Congressman Todd Akin easily won a third term over Democrat George Weber and Libertarian Tamara Millay.

District 3

Freshman incumbent Congressman Russ Carnahan, a Democrat, had an easy time in winning a second term in this fairly liberal district based in the southern portion of St. Louis.

District 4

Incumbent Democratic Congressman Ike Skelton, seeking his sixteenth term in this conservative, west-central Missouri-based district, overwhelmed Republican candidate Jim Noland, Libertarian nominee Bryce Holthouse, and Progressive Party candidate Mel Ivey and was victorious.

District 5

Coming from a surprisingly-close election in 2004, freshman incumbent Congressman Emanuel Cleaver, a Democrat, easily defeated Republican nominee Jacob Turk to win a third term in this fairly liberal district based in Kansas City.

District 6

In this conservative, northwest Missouri district, incumbent Republican Congressman Sam Graves easily dispatched with Democratic nominee Sara Jo Shettles, Libertarian candidate Erik Buck, and Progressive candidate Shirley Yurkonis to win a fourth term in Congress.

District 7

Incumbent Republican Congressman Roy Blunt, the House Majority Whip, found no difficulty in winning a sixth term in his very conservative district located in southwest Missouri.

District 8

In the most conservative district found in Missouri, incumbent Republican Congresswoman Jo Ann Emerson coasted to re-election, swamping Democratic nominee Veronica Hambacker and Libertarian nominee Branden McCullough.

District 9

This district, based in "Little Dixie," located in northeast Missouri, has a strongly conservative bent and incumbent Republican Congressman Kenny Hulshof sought and won a sixth term against several opponents.

References

Missouri
2006
2006 Missouri elections